The 2020 FIBA Women's Olympic Qualifying Tournament in Foshan/Belgrade was one of four 2020 FIBA Women's Olympic Qualifying Tournaments. The tournament was planned to be held in Foshan, China, from 6 to 9 February 2020. The tournament was played in Belgrade, Serbia due to concerns about the coronavirus pandemic.

China, Spain and South Korea qualified for the Olympics.

Teams

Venue

Squads

Standings

Results
All times are local (UTC+1).

Statistics and awards

Statistical leaders
Players

Points

Rebounds

Assists

Blocks

Steals

Teams

Points

Rebounds

Assists

Blocks

Steals

Awards
The all star-teams and MVP were announced on 9 February 2020.

References

External links
Official website

FIBA World Olympic Qualifying Tournament for Women
 
Qual
2019–20 in Serbian basketball
International women's basketball competitions hosted by Serbia
Impact of the COVID-19 pandemic on the 2020 Summer Olympics